The Kemano River is a river in the Kitimat Ranges of the Coast Mountains in British Columbia, Canada.  It flows into Kemano Bay on the Gardner Canal near the Kemano powerhouse and former townsite.

See also
List of rivers of British Columbia

References

Rivers of the Kitimat Ranges
Rivers of the North Coast of British Columbia
Range 4 Coast Land District